Atitjere is a community in Akityarre Ward of the Central Desert Region in the Northern Territory of Australia.

The 2016 Australian census which was conducted in August 2016 reports that Atitjere had a population of 224 of which 173 (77.9%) identified as “Aboriginal and/or Torres Strait Islander people.” 

Hart is located within the federal division of Lingiari, the territory electoral division of Namatjira and the local government area of the Central Desert Region.

References

Populated places in the Northern Territory
Central Desert Region